The OM660 is a turbocharged straight-three engine produced by Mercedes-Benz for use in Smart vehicles, from 1999 to 2014.

Design 
The OM660 features a single-overhead camshaft with two valves per cylinder and an aluminium alloy cylinder block and head. It is turbocharged and features an exhaust gas recirculation system. The OM660 was updated in 2007 receiving increased performance due to a new common rail fuel system with increased boost pressure, and again in 2011 featuring further performance and efficiency improvements.

Models

OM660 (30 kW version) 
 1999–2006 W450 Smart Fortwo

OM660 (33 kW version) 
 2007–2009 W451 Smart Fortwo

OM660 (40 kW version) 
 2009–2014 W451 Smart Fortwo

References 

OM660
Diesel engines by model
Straight-three engines